Amsterdam 1956 was a chess tournament won by Vasily Smyslov. It was the Candidates Tournament for the 1957 World Chess Championship match between Smyslov and Mikhail Botvinnik.

{|class="wikitable" style="text-align: center"
! # !! Player !! 1 !! 2 !! 3 !! 4 !! 5 !! 6 !! 7 !! 8 !! 9 !! 10 !! Total
|-
| 1 || align=left |  ||xx ||½½ ||½½ ||0½ ||½½ ||½1 ||11 ||½1 ||1½||½1|| 11½
|-
| 2 || align=left |  ||½½ ||xx ||½½ ||½½ ||½½ ||½1 ||½½ ||½0||1½ ||1½|| 10
|-
| 3 || align=left |  ||½½ ||½½ ||xx ||1½ ||½½ ||½½ ||½1 ||0½||½½||01|| 9½
|-
| 4 || align=left |  ||1½ ||½½ ||0½ ||xx ||½½ ||½1 ||0½ ||½½||½½||½1|| 9½
|-
| 5 || align=left |  ||½½ ||½½ ||½½ ||½½ ||xx ||0½ ||01 ||1½ ||½½||1½|| 9½
|-
| 6 || align=left |  ||½0||½0||½½||½0 ||1½||xx ||½1||1½||½½||½1|| 9½
|-      
| 7 || align=left |  ||00||½½||½0||1½||10||½0||xx ||11||½1||1½|| 9½
|-      
| 8 || align=left |  ||½0||½1||1½||½½||0½||0½||00||xx ||10||½1|| 8
|-      
| 9 || align=left |  ||0½||0½||½½||½½||½½||½½||½0||01||xx ||1½|| 8
|-     
| 10 || align=left |   ||½0||0½||10||½0||0½||½0||0½||½0||0½ ||xx || 5
|-     
|}

References 

1956
Chess competitions
1956 in chess
Chess in the Netherlands
Sports competitions in Amsterdam
1956 in Dutch sport
1950s in Amsterdam